How to Break Up with Your Douchebag (Spanish: Cómo cortar a tu patán) is a 2017 Mexican romantic comedy film directed by Gabriela Tagliavini, and premiered on 6 October 2017. The film stars Mariana Treviño, Christopher von Uckermann, Camila Sodi y Sebastián Zurita.

Plot 
Amanda Lozano (Mariana Treviño), is a woman who makes a living as a therapist specializing in helping women end destructive relationships. She is a successful and empowered woman, but she discovers that her sister Natalia (Camila Sodi) is in love with a lazy and macho idiot named René (Sebastián Zurita), who repeatedly cheats on her. To separate her from him, she plans a strategy to get her sister to fall in love with her best friend Leo (Christopher von Uckermann). What he doesn't know is that in the middle of this mission he will have to face his greatest fear of all: love.

Cast 
 Mariana Treviño as Amanda
 Christopher von Uckermann as Leo
 Camila Sodi as Natalia
 Sebastián Zurita as Pepe
 Marianna Burelli as Regina
 Giovanna Zacarías as Valeria
 Marina de Tavira as Armando's mother
 Michelle Rodríguez as Martita
 Uriel del Toro as Novio Yogurt 3
 Nacho Tahhan as Novio Sano

References

External links 
 

Mexican romantic comedy films
2017 romantic comedy films
2010s Mexican films